The Jurien Bay Marine Park is a protected marine park that is located  north of Perth, off the coastal tip of the Wheatbelt region of Western Australia. It includes many of the islands located in this region.

Features
The park name is from the French naval administration Charles-Marie Jurien de la Gravière. The park's management plans were considered for some years before declaration.

Approximately 12 per cent of West Australian waters are currently included in marine parks and reserves, and about 2.4 per cent of state waters are in sanctuary (‘no take’) zones. A small part of the Jurien Bay Marine Park has been allocated as a sanctuary and is subject to fisheries regulations.

Western Australia’s marine areas are among the least disturbed in the world rich in biodiversity as the coast has two overlapping biogeographic regions, the tropical north (north of Ningaloo Marine Park) and the temperate south (east of Cape Leeuwin) so both tropical and temperate species occur here. Along the eastern boundary of the Indian Ocean the Leeuwin Current carries warm water along this coast from the equator to the southern coast.

Flora and fauna
The park includes sea lion and seabird breeding areas along with temperate reefs populated by the temperate and tropical plants and animals supported by the warm Leeuwin current. In the extensive seagrass meadows western rock lobsters serve as nursery areas. Whales migrate each year along the western coast of Australia and visitors can see the incredible variety of marine life found in the waters off Jurien Bay's coast as well as having the opportunity to interact with seals, sea lions and dolphins - go swimming, snorkelling, scuba diving, fishing, and exploring the offshore reefs and islands.

The Jurien Bay Marine Park is administered by the Marine Parks and Reserves Authority and managed by the Department of Environment and Conservation in partnership with the local community. The Department of Fisheries continues to manage commercial and recreational fishing and aquaculture in the marine park in close cooperation with the Department of Environment and Conservation. The town of Jurien Bay boasts a modern boat harbour, which has become the focus for the expanding aquaculture industry.

See also

 Integrated Marine and Coastal Regionalisation of Australia
 Protected areas of Western Australia

References

National parks of Western Australia
Marine parks of Western Australia